Lisa Lynn Aliff Greenleaf (born September 10, 1960) is an American beauty pageant winner and former actress.

Early life, education, and career
Born in Roanoke, Virginia, Aliff attended Cave Spring High School, and thereafter graduated college with a degree in early childhood education.

After being named Miss Roanoke Valley and being the runner-up in the 1981 Miss Virginia pageant, Aliff won the pageant in 1983. She then moved to Los Angeles and became an actress, appearing in a number of films and TV shows. Her first role was as Gail Kittredge on the TV show The Colbys, Season 1, Episode 24 "Checkmate" which aired on 22 May 1986. Over the next four years she also appeared in episodes of Cheers, Charles in Charge, Roomies, Valerie, Full House, Love and Betrayal, Who's the Boss?, Freddy's Nightmares, Dear John and Anything but Love. In 1986, she was cast as Alice Sycamore (née Vanderhof) in a starring role on You Can't Take It with You, a half-hour sitcom produced for syndication in 1986, but only four episodes of the show were aired.

In 1987, Aliff was the primary model for Sheer Indulgence pantyhose, appearing in two separate commercials which were broadcast nationally over the course of the next two years.  The commercials were released upon the debut of the pantyhose, which were marketed as having department store quality but available in local markets at a lesser price.

Aliff worked with Dan Aykroyd and Tom Hanks in the movie Dragnet (1987). In 1994, Aliff was involved in a public divorce in which she said her husband falsely accused her of having an affair with Dan Aykroyd, so that her husband could obtain money through tabloid interviews and TV appearances. Her husband's allegation appeared in a two-page spread in the National Enquirer and he appeared on The Montel Williams Show. Aykroyd, who was married to another Miss Virginia, Donna Dixon, said the allegation was a "baseless fantasy" and a "flat lie".

Her last acting roles were in 1990. After returning to Roanoke, she taught elementary school, middle school and high school. , she continued to be involved in the Miss Virginia pageant.

Filmography

Movies

TV series

References

External links
 

American actresses
Miss Virginia winners
1960 births
Living people
People from Roanoke, Virginia
21st-century American women